The translocon (also known as a translocator or translocation channel) is a complex of proteins associated with the translocation of polypeptides across membranes. In eukaryotes the term translocon most commonly refers to the complex that transports nascent polypeptides with a targeting signal sequence into the interior (cisternal or lumenal) space of the endoplasmic reticulum (ER) from the cytosol. This translocation process requires the protein to cross a hydrophobic lipid bilayer. The same complex is also used to integrate nascent proteins into the membrane itself (membrane proteins). In prokaryotes, a similar protein complex transports polypeptides across the (inner) plasma membrane or integrates membrane proteins. In either case, the protein complex are formed from Sec proteins (Sec: secretory), with the heterotrimeric Sec61 being the channel. In prokaryotes, the homologous channel complex is known as SecYEG.

This article focuses on the cell's native translocons, but pathogens can also assemble other translocons in their host membranes, allowing them to export virulence factors into their target cells.

Central channel

The translocation channel is a hetero-trimeric protein complex called SecYEG in prokaryotes and Sec61 in eukaryotes. It consists of the subunits SecY, SecE, and SecG. The structure of this channel, in its idle state, has been solved by X-ray crystallography in archaea. SecY is the large pore subunit. In a side view, the channel has an hourglass shape, with a funnel on each side. The extracellular funnel has a little "plug" formed out of an alpha-helix. In the middle of the membrane is a construction, formed from a pore ring of six hydrophobic amino acids that project their side chains inwards. During protein translocation, the plug is moved out of the way, and a polypeptide chain is moved from the cytoplasmic funnel, through the pore ring, the extracellular funnel, into the extracellular space. Hydrophobic segments of membrane proteins exit sideways through the lateral gate into the lipid phase and become membrane-spanning segments.

In bacteria, SecYEG forms a complex with SecDF, YajC and YidC. In eukaryotes, Sec61 forms a complex with the oligosaccharyl transferase complex, the TRAP complex, and the membrane protein TRAM (possible chaperone). For further components, such as signal peptidase complex and the SRP receptor it is not clear to what extent they only associate transiently to the translocon complex.

Translocation 
The channel allows peptides to move in either direction, so additional systems in the translocon are required to move the peptide in a specific direction. There are three types of translocation: cotranslational translocation that happens as translation happens, and two types of post-translational translocation that happens after translation, each seen in eukaryotes and bacteria. While eukaryotes unfold the protein with BiP and use other complexes to transport the peptide, bacteria use the SecA ATPase.

Co-translational  

In co-translational translocation, the translocon associates with the ribosome so that a growing nascent polypeptide chain is moved from the ribosome tunnel into the SecY channel. The translocon (translocator) acts as a channel through the hydrophobic membrane of the endoplasmic reticulum (after the SRP has dissociated and translation is continued). The emerging polypeptide is threaded through the channel as an unfolded string of amino acids, potentially driven by a Brownian Ratchet. Once translation is finished, a signal peptidase cleaves off the short signal peptide from the nascent protein, leaving the polypeptide free in the interior of the endoplasmic reticulum.

In eukaryotes, proteins due to be translocated to the endoplasmic reticulum are recognized by the signal-recognition particle (SRP), which halts translation of the polypeptide by the ribosome while it attaches the ribosome to the SRP receptor on the endoplasmic reticulum. This recognition event is based upon a specific N-terminal signal sequence that is in the first few codons of the polypeptide to be synthesised. Bacteria also use an SRP, together with a chaperone YidC that is similar to the eukaryote TRAM.

The translocon can also translocate and integrate membrane proteins in the correct orientation into the membrane of the endoplasmic reticulum. The mechanism of this process is not fully understood, but involves the recognition and processing by the translocon of hydrophobic stretches in the amino acid sequence which are destined to become transmembrane helices. Closed by stop-transfer sequences and opened by embedded signal sequences, the plug alters between its open and closed states to place helices in different orientations.

Post-translational 
In eukaryotes, post-translational translocation depends on BiP and other complexes, including the SEC62/SEC63 integral membrane protein complex. In this mode of translocation, Sec63 helps BiP hydrolyze ATP, which then binds to the peptide and "pulls" it out. This process is repeated for other BiP molecules until the entire peptide has been pulled through.

In bacteria, the same process is done by a "pushing" ATPase known as SecA, sometimes assisted by the SecDF complex on the other side responsible for pulling. The SecA ATPase uses a "push-and-slide" mechanism to move a polypeptide through the channel. In the ATP-bound state, SecA interacts through a two-helix finger with a subset of amino acids in a substrate, pushing them (with ATP hydrolysis) into the channel. The interaction is then weakened as SecA enters the ADP-bound state, allowing the polypeptide chain to slide passively in either direction. SecA then grabs a further section of the peptide to repeat the process.

The ER-retrotranslocon
Translocators can also move polypeptides (such as damaged proteins targeted for proteasomes) from the cisternal space of the endoplasmic reticulum to the cytosol. ER-proteins are degraded in the cytosol by the 26S proteasome, a process known as endoplasmic-reticulum-associated protein degradation, and therefore have to be transported by an appropriate channel. This retrotranslocon is still enigmatic.

It was initially believed that the Sec61 channel is responsible for this retrograde transport, implying that transport through Sec61 is not always unidirectional but also can be bidirectional. However, the structure of Sec61 does not support this view and several different proteins have been suggested to be responsible for transport from the ER lumen into the cytosol.

See also 
SecY protein
Sec61
Protein targeting
Bacterial secretion system

References 

Protein complexes
Integral membrane proteins
Protein targeting